Priyatelsky is a rural locality (a settlement) in Dubrovsky Selsoviet, Aleysky District, Altai Krai, Russia. The population was 219 as of 2013. There are 5 streets.

Geography 
Priyatelsky is located 42 km southeast of Aleysk (the district's administrative centre) by road. Tolstaya Dubrova is the nearest rural locality.

References 

Rural localities in Aleysky District